Caroline Møller Hansen (born 19 December 1998) is a Danish professional footballer who plays as a striker for Real Madrid and for Denmark.

Career

Club
She played for Fortuna Hjørring in the Elite Division from 2015 to 2020.  In 2020 she moved to Inter Milan and in 2021 she moved to Real Madrid.

National
She has played for Denmark's U/16, U/19, and U/23 national teams, and in August 2017 she was selected for the senior national team for a friendly match against the Netherlands, which was cancelled, and for the World Cup qualifier against Hungary. Despite these games being cancelled, she kept her spot on the team. She made her debut for the national team on 4 March 2020 at the Algarve Cup in the 1–2 defeat against Norway, when she was substituted after 61 minutes for Emma Snerle.

Honours

Club
Fortuna Hjørring
Champion
 Elitedivisionen: 2015–16, 2019–20
 Danish Women's Cup: 2016

Football career transfers and statistics 
The following is a list of football clubs and seasons in which Caroline Møller Hansen has played. It includes the total number of appearance (caps), substitution details, goals, yellow and red cards stats.

References

External links
 
 Danish Football Union (DBU) statistics

1998 births
Living people
Danish women's footballers
Fortuna Hjørring players
Inter Milan (women) players
Serie A (women's football) players
Real Madrid Femenino players
Primera División (women) players
Expatriate women's footballers in Italy
Danish expatriate sportspeople in Italy
Women's association football forwards
Denmark women's international footballers
Danish expatriate women's footballers
Danish expatriate sportspeople in Spain
Danish expatriate sportspeople in the United States
Expatriate women's soccer players in the United States
Expatriate women's footballers in Spain
IMG Academy alumni
Association football forwards
Denmark international footballers
Expatriate soccer managers in the United States